Benjamin Maas (born January 23, 1989) is a German footballer who plays as a defender. He is currently playing for Wormatia Worms.

Career

Maas was released by VfB Stuttgart as a 19-year-old, signing for SV Sandhausen where he spent a season without making a first-team appearance. He spent the next three years playing reserve team football, one season for 1899 Hoffenheim II (where he won Oberliga Baden-Württemberg title) and two for SpVgg Greuther Fürth II before signing for SV Darmstadt 98 of the 3. Liga in 2012. He made his debut for the club in August of that year, as a substitute for Benjamin Gorka in a 2–1 win over Preußen Münster. He was regularly used as a substitute during the 2013–14 season, which saw Darmstadt surpisngly finish in third place and win promotion after a playoff win over Arminia Bielefeld, which Maas didn't play in. He left the club in July 2014.

External links
 
 

1989 births
Living people
German footballers
SV Darmstadt 98 players
TSG 1899 Hoffenheim II players
SpVgg Greuther Fürth players
SV Sandhausen players
3. Liga players
Regionalliga players
Association football central defenders
People from Schwäbisch Hall
Sportspeople from Stuttgart (region)
Footballers from Baden-Württemberg